Henry George Ell (probably 24 September 1862 – 27 June 1934), commonly known as Harry Ell, was a Christchurch City councillor and a New Zealand Member of Parliament. He is famous for his conservation work around Christchurch's Port Hills, his advocacy for the Summit Road, and his construction of the Sign of the Takahe and other road houses along the Summit Road.

Early years

Ell was born in Christchurch, New Zealand, and grew up on his father's farm in Halswell. As a teenager he worked at the Canterbury Museum, then as a farm hand.  Between 1881 and 1884 he was a member of the Armed Constabulary in Taranaki, where he participated in the destruction of Parihaka. This experience turned him into a stern critic of the race-relations policies of the time.

Ell was a Christchurch City councillor in 1903 and then again between 1917 and 1919. He was a member of the Knights of Labour and the Canterbury Liberal Association.

Member of Parliament

Ell stood as a prohibitionist for a seat in the City of Christchurch electorate in 1896.  He was unsuccessful, coming fifth in the three-member electorate, but was elected as an Independent Liberal in the 1899 general election. He held the seat, and the subsequent seat of Christchurch South as an Independent, until the 1919 general election. Ell stood for the Lyttelton electorate, which contained the Port Hills. He was defeated and did not win a seat in Parliament again.

Ell was associated with the New Liberal Party in 1905.

From 1910 until 1912 he was the Liberal Party's junior whip.

As a Member of the House of Representatives, Ell spoke against the relaxation of liquor laws, the jailing of alcoholics and against gambling.  He also successfully pushed for reform of New Zealand's mental health laws. He served briefly as Postmaster General in the Cabinet of Thomas Mackenzie.

The Summit Road rest houses
Ell is most remembered for his strong interest in recreation and conservation. From 1900 onwards, Ell pushed for the creation of a network of scenic reserves along Christchurch's Port Hills, linked by the Summit Road and with a network of rest-houses to allow travellers and walkers to refresh themselves. Three of these rest-houses, designed by architect Samuel Hurst Seager, were completed during Ell's lifetime: the Sign of the Bellbird, Sign of the Kiwi, and Sign of the Packhorse. The last, and grandest, the Sign of the Takahe, was not completed until long after Ell's death, in 1949. All four houses were built of local stone, and designed to blend in with the landscape. The Sign of the Kiwi and Sign of the Takahe still function as commercial rest stops serving refreshments while the Sign of the Bellbird survives only as a shelter, but is still a useful stopping place for a picnic and the starting point for some short walks. The Sign of the Packhorse is managed by the Department of Conservation and used as a hut by trampers.

Quotes
Ell's political philosophy was simple: "Our aim in life is to effect such social and economic reforms as will improve the lot of our fellow men and women".
As a parliamentarian, Ell was proud of his independent status. During his 1899 election campaign he maintained the view that: "a member should pledge himself to the people, not to party or to Prime Minister.".

Notes

References

 Harry Ell and His Summit Road : a Biography of Henry George Ell by Lenore Oakley, published by Caxton Press 1960

Further reading

Works by Harry Ell

 n.p.

Works about Harry Ell

 

 Harry Ell and His Summit Road : a Biography of Henry George Ell by Lenore Oakley, published by Caxton Press 1960

External links

 Ell's DNZB Biography
 The Port Hills, Christchurch City Council
 Sign of the Packhorse, Department of Conservation
 Summitroadsociety.org , Summit Road Society
  Sign of the Kiwi and Sign of the Takahe, Christchurch City Libraries

|-

|-

Independent MPs of New Zealand
Christchurch City Councillors
Members of the Cabinet of New Zealand
New Zealand farmers
New Zealand Liberal Party MPs
New Zealand temperance activists
1862 births
1934 deaths
New Zealand MPs for Christchurch electorates
New Zealand conservationists
Members of the New Zealand House of Representatives
Unsuccessful candidates in the 1896 New Zealand general election
Unsuccessful candidates in the 1919 New Zealand general election
Unsuccessful candidates in the 1925 New Zealand general election
19th-century New Zealand politicians